Cinevistaas Limited, formerly known as Cinevista Communications Limited, is an Indian production house founded by Prem Krishen. Based in Mumbai, Maharashtra, it is known for producing successful shows like Crime Patrol, Sanjivani, Dill Mill Gayye, Dil Dosti Dance, Ek Hazaaron Mein Meri Behna Hai, Ek Hasina Thi, Beyhadh, and Bepannah.

History
The company was formed on 1 January 1993 by Prem Krishen and Sunil Mehta as a Partnership firm known as 'Cinevista Communications' but was subsequently incorporated as a Private Limited Company as 'Cinevista Communications Private Limited' under Part IX of the Companies Act, 1956 and became a Public Limited Company on 20 December 1999 as 'Cinevista Communications Limited'. In 2016, one of the key producers, Sidharth Malhotra moved out of Cinevistaas and started his own production company. In 2018, on the sets of Bepannaah, a fire broke out, it has been said that fire safety equipment was not working in the studio, and the studio did not submit a mandatory working check for the fire fighting  systems, hence they were disallowed to shoot until proper fire safety is put in place, during the fire a 20 year old assistant also died.

Current productions
Bhalobese Sokhi on Zee Bangla

Vladimir and Oksana and the Magic of Peace

Productions
The company has produced the following television and films:

Television

Films

Awards and nominations

References

Sources
 Interview with television and film producer Prem Kishen
 Cinevistaas Limited at Google Finance

External links
Cinevistaas Limited, Official website
Cinevistaas News Article on MoneyControl

Film production companies based in Mumbai
Television production companies of India
Mass media companies established in 1993
Indian companies established in 1993
1993 establishments in Maharashtra
Companies listed on the National Stock Exchange of India
Companies listed on the Bombay Stock Exchange